Women's handball at the 2019 South Asian Games was held in Pokhara, Nepal from December 4 to December 9, 2019.

Preliminary round
All times are Nepal Standard Time (UTC+05:45)

Group A

Group B

Final round

Semi-finals

Bronze medal match

Final

Final standings

References

External links 
 SAG 2019 Official Website

2019 South Asian Games
Handball at the South Asian Games